Mary Frances Early (born June 14, 1936) was the first African-American to earn a degree from the University of Georgia.

Early years and education
Early was born on June 14, 1936, in Atlanta, Georgia. She attended Turner High School there and went on to graduate from Clark College (later Clark Atlanta University) with a bachelor's degree in music education in 1957. She began her postgraduate work at the University of Michigan to pursue a master's degree in music education then enrolled at the University of Georgia in 1961, receiving her master's degree (MMEd) in music education on August 16, 1962. She also earned an Ed.S. degree in music education in 1967 from Georgia.

Career
During Early's career, she spent time as a music teacher, a planning and development co-ordinator, an elementary division curriculum specialist and a music resource teacher at various schools, including John Hope Elementary, Wesley Avenue Elementary Schools and Coan Middle School. In addition, she was an adjunct professor at Morehouse and Spelman Colleges a music co-ordinator and supervisor of Atlanta Public Schools. She was the first African-American president of the Georgia Music Educators Association in 1981. In 2003, Early was the head of the music department at Clark Atlanta University.

Recognition
Early's awards include the STAR Teacher Award from Coan Middle School (1972), the Benjamin E. Mays Black Music Heritage Award (1995), the University of Georgia Outstanding Alumna Award (2000) and the Foot Soldier for Equal Justice (University of Georgia) Award. In light of this attention, she said, "It wasn't in our vocabulary to think that people were good or bad because of their skin color, so I was just sort of taken aback that it became a big issue later in my life." On May 10, 2013, at the Spring Commencement Ceremony, Early was honored by the University of Georgia when President Michael F. Adams presented her with an honorary doctorate of laws degree. Early's honorary doctorate is only the 79th honorary doctoral degree conferred in UGA's history. In 2019, the Board of Regents of the University System of Georgia approved changing the name of the UGA School of Education in her honor.

In the fall 2005 issue of the Graduate School Magazine, Early was profiledby Cynthia Adams as a "They Were First" subject under the title, "Mary Frances Early Speaks: on a public education and the dynamics of change". She was also included as a profile (pp 65–70) in the 2010 commemorative book, Centennial: Graduate Education at the University of Georgia 1910-2010, which was published by the University of Georgia Graduate School (2010) and written by Cynthia Adams. UGA President Jere Morehead presented Early with a presidential medal in 2018.

References

External links
"A Look Back - A Brief History of UGA’s Desegregation", University of Georgia. Retrieved April 23, 2016.
"FSP Unsung Foot Soldiers - Mary Frances Early", University of Georgia. Retrieved April 23, 2016.
"Mary Frances Early (b. 1936)", New Georgia Encyclopedia. Retrieved April 23, 2016.
"The first time", Athens Banner Herald. Retrieved April 23, 2016. 
"More than 5,000 eligible for UGA commencement", Athens Banner Herald. Retrieved April 23, 2016. 

1936 births
Living people
University of Georgia alumni
People from Atlanta
University of Michigan School of Education alumni
Schoolteachers from Georgia (U.S. state)
Clark Atlanta University faculty
Clark Atlanta University alumni
American women academics